The G-Shock is a line of watches manufactured by the Japanese electronics company Casio, designed to resist mechanical stress, shock and vibration. G-Shock is an abbreviation for Gravitational Shock. The watches in the G-Shock line are designed primarily for sports, military and outdoors-oriented activities; all G-Shocks have a chronograph feature, 200 metre water resistance and an alarm, with either a digital display, analogue display or a combination of analogue and digital displays. Other features such as a countdown timer, world clock, and a backlight are included in most models. Newer high-end models in the line also feature GPS, directional, pressure and temperature sensors, radio-controlled time adjustment (known as WaveCeptor or Multi-Band) and Bluetooth time adjustment achieved via connecting to a smartphone via a dedicated application.

History

The G-Shock was conceptualised in 1981 by Casio engineer Kikuo Ibe when he accidentally dropped and broke a pocket watch given to him by his father. The G-Shock then was conceived as a watch which would have "triple 10" resistance, meaning it would have a battery life of 10 years, have a water resistance of 10 bar and could survive a fall of 10 metres.

A team of three individuals was selected by Ibe which was known as "team tough". The team had assembled and tested nearly 200 prototypes but were still not able to achieve the conception criteria. During a visit to a playground, Ibe discovered that in a rubber ball, the centre of the ball doesn't suffer the effects of the shock during a bounce on a rough surface which gave him the idea to implement that concept into the watch. With that in mind, the team set out to develop a watch using such a concept and in April 1983, the first G-Shock, the DW-5000C, was launched.

The shock-resistant design on the original G-Shock has 10 layers protecting the quartz timekeeping module, including a urethane rubber bumper, the stainless steel case, the hardened mineral glass watch crystal, the stainless steel screwed down caseback, and the "floating module" where the quartz mechanism floats free in a urethane foam cradle, with the outer buttons and LCD module attached with flexible cables. The strap of the watch is also designed to protect the module during a fall.

Initial sales of the G-Shock line were sluggish in Japan as people preferred dress watches. In order to promote the G-Shock worldwide, the American division of Casio released a commercial in which an ice hockey player used the DW-5000C as a hockey puck to demonstrate the toughness of the watch. The commercial gained negative publicity and Casio was accused of false advertising. A TV news channel then set out to conduct live tests on the DW-5000C to check whether it was as tough and durable as advertised. This involved repeating the action shown in the commercial. The DW-5000C survived the impact of the hockey stick, and the G-Shock gained popularity among the general public. The popularity of G-Shocks increased throughout the 1990s. By 1998, Casio had released more than 200 different G-Shock models, with worldwide sales at 19 million units.

In 1985, Casio released the DW-5500C, which was the first G-Shock to feature a mud-resistant structure. Called the G-Shock-II due to the new construction feature, it was nicknamed "Mudman" by collectors due to its mud resistance capabilities. Casio would then go on to release a mud-resistant line of watches in 1995 which would go on to be called Mudman.

In 1989, Casio introduced the AW-500, which was the first G-Shock featuring an analog display with a digital sub display at the 6-o'clock position.

In 1992, Casio released the DW-6100 equipped with a temperature sensor thus making it the first G-Shock to be equipped with a sensor. The watch also featured a resin (plastic) case instead of the original stainless steel case of earlier models for improved shock resistance. This move would transition into most of the models in the subsequent years with the original G-Shock square design also adopting the same construction. By the early 2000s, the G-2000 model marked the last standard G-Shock to use a stainless steel case, leaving only a few speciality models in the line-up featuring the traditional metal case construction.

In 1993, Casio introduced the DW-6300 Frogman, which was the first ISO 6425 certified diver's watch in the G-Shock lineup. The Frogman also marked the start of the MAN or "master of G" line of G-Shocks which was used to introduce new features and functions in the G-Shock lineup. Notable watches which introduced such features are as follows:
 DW-8600 Fisherman (1996): First G-Shock having a tide-graph and moonphase feature. This model was a precursor to the more popular Gulfman series first introduced in 1998.
 DW-9300 Raysman (1998): First G-Shock to have tough solar battery recharging technology.
 DW-9800 Wademan (1999): First G-Shock with directional sensor.
 AW-571 Gaussman (1999): First G-Shock having magnetic field resistance.
 DWG-100 Lungman (1999): First G-Shock incorporating a pulse sensor.
 GW-100 Antman (2000): First G-Shock having the capability to receive time calibration signal from a radio tower.
 GW-9400 Rangeman (2013): First G-Shock incorporating triple sensors (pressure sensor, temperature sensor and direction sensor).
 GPW-1000 Gravitymaster (2016): First G-Shock having GPS-hybrid time reception technology.
 GWN-Q1000 Gulfmaster (2016): First G-Shock with quad sensors (pressure sensor, temperature sensor, depth sensor and direction sensor).
 GPR-B1000 Rangeman (2018): First G-Shock featuring GPS navigation and Memory-In-Pixel (MIP) display technology.

In 1994, the DW-6600 model marked the transition to Electroluminescent backlight technology for G-Shock watches from backlights employing incandescent bulbs in earlier models. The same year also saw Casio introducing the Baby-G branded G-Shock watches designed for women.

In 1996, Casio released the MRG-100 model (also known as the DW-8900 in some markets) under its premium MRG lineup of G-Shocks which was the first G-Shock watch to feature full metal construction. The "floating module" concept was retained by cushioning the module between the metal case and metal bezel of the watch and an air-tight glass packing was added to improve shock resistance. Initially featuring a digital display, the MRG line would go on to adopt a full analog display featuring stepper motors for each hand and would be slotted as the top-of-the-line premium G-Shock lineup.

In 2008, Casio introduced the Tough Movement for high-end analog G-Shocks. The movement incorporates a light emitting diode (LED) photo receptor which analyses the position of the watch hands by the passage of light via a small hole in the dial. Every uneven reception of light by the phototransistor due to impact to the watch enables the stepper motors in the movement to correct the alignment of the hands requiring no manual adjustment. The hour, minute and second hands feature separate motors in order to allow for quick adjustment of the watch.

A similar series to the Baby-G called the G-Shock Mini was introduced in 2009. It is 30% smaller than a regular G-Shock and was originally marketed for women. However, they were later released in unisex variants intended for people who have smaller wrists. This series was later replaced by the S-Series in 2014.

In 2013 in order to celebrate 30 years of the G-Shock, Casio arranged a party in New York and showcased new models as well as various prototypes of upcoming models. The party included a performance from rapper Eminem.

On 1 September 2017, Casio celebrated its 100 millionth sale of G-Shocks worldwide.

Models

The line of watches now includes atomic clock, GPS and Bluetooth time synchronisation and tough solar technology. Many newer models feature metal (steel or titanium) bands and a mix of analogue-digital timekeeping, analogue timekeeping or digital timekeeping.

The DW models are standard battery-powered G-Shocks while GW models of the G-Shock come with either Tough Solar or Multi-Band atomic timekeeping or both. Models with "B" prefix in their model name before the number are bluetooth enabled while those having "P" prefix in the model name before the number have GPS time reception or navigation capabilities.

Twice a year, the basic models are updated. New limited models are introduced more frequently throughout the year. Special models are released upon the anniversary celebration of the G-Shock brand and are sold through selected retail channels.

Casio also produces collaboration models, often with popular fashion brands and artists, like A Bathing Ape (Bape), Stüssy, Xlarge, Eric Haze, KIKS TYO, Nano Universe, Levi's, Lifted Research Group, as well as Coca-Cola, Pulp68 Skateshop, Lucky Strike and Marlboro.

G-Shock watches are popular with mountaineers, firefighters, paramedics, people working in the offshore, police officers, astronauts, film directors (Tony Scott was often pictured wearing a GW-3000B, as are Ron Howard and Francis Ford Coppola) and soldiers. Ex-Special Forces-British SAS soldier Andy McNab mentions in several of his novels how his character Nick Stone relies on a G-Shock watch. According to Mark Bowden's book Blackhawk Down, the DELTA Operators wore G-Shock watches during the combat events of 3 and 4 October 1993. Since then, G-Shock watches have become very popular with Special Forces groups in both American and other NATO nation units, due to being "battle tested".

The DW-5600C, DW-5600E, DW-5900, DW-6600 and DW-6900 models are flight-qualified for NASA space travel. Casio has updated the DW-5600E module, replacing the usual 1545 module with module number 3229 (in 2010) increasing the full-auto calendar to the year 2099 instead of 2039 in the previous module.

In 2009, Casio introduced the GW-M5610, a solar powered variant of the DW-5600 incorporating Multi-Band 6 time reception technology and a design homage to the original DW-5000C which was an update to the earlier GW-M5600 model. The GW-M5610 would spawn many variants, the most notable being the GW-5000 which was a steel cased screw-back variant like the original G-Shock but featured diamond like coating (dlc) on the case and caseback and the GW-S5600 which featured Casio's first application of carbon fibre in a watch strap along with the use of titanium in the caseback, screws and buttons, making it the most lightest G-Shock model available. The GW-M5610 series saw an update in September 2021 which consisted of replacement of the previous 3159 module with 3495 module. The new module replaced the Electroluminescent backlight for an LED backlight, made the home time visible in almost all watch modes and increased world time cities to incorporate cities having odd time differentials along with adding time-swap feature with the home time, the ability to set DD-MM and MM-DD formats for the date and day display, the ability to display the day of the week in different languages and added the ability to set the count-down timer to 1 second.

In 2012, Casio released the GB-6900 and GB-5600 which were Bluetooth-enabled models of the G-Shock giving them the ability to connect to a smartphone via an app, allowing the users to adjust various functions of the watch using the phone and receive notification alerts of the phone on the watch. There was also a phone-find feature which allowed the users to find the smartphone with which the watch is paired in case it is misplaced. The phone would ring regardless of the ringtone setting on the press of a button on the watch. Casio claimed the battery life of 2 years on a single CR2032 battery. Since then, the Bluetooth technology has been incorporated in many models including high-end variants. The Bluetooth lineup would be further expanded to incorporate tough solar and multi-band atomic time reception with the GW-B5600 (basic resin model) and the GMW-B5000 (full metal screw-back cased models) in 2018. The series would later spawn a variant slotted in the MR-G lineup of premium watches called the MRG-B5000 which sported full titanium construction for the case and bracelet as well as a sapphire watch glass in 2022. The MRG-B5000 is the first square model to incorporate a multi-piece bezel for improved shock resistance.

The GW-9400 Rangeman (introduced in 2013) and GWN-1000 Gulfmaster (introduced in 2014) models have a Triple Sensor with a digital compass, thermometer, and barometer/altimeter and were the first watches to receive such technology. The MTG-S1000, GW-A1000, and GPW-1000 feature Triple G Resist which includes resistance to shock, centrifugal gravity, and vibration. In 2014, Casio introduced the GPS Hybrid Wave Ceptor feature in the GPW-1000 Gravitymaster that allows the watch to synchronize the time through GPS signals and also adjusts the time zone automatically. The MRG-G1000 is also equipped with this feature.

At Baselworld 2015, Casio introduced the "Dream Project" (G-D5000-9JR) concept which was a Casio G-Shock square having most of its parts constructed of 18 Karat solid gold as part of the 35th anniversary celebrations of the G-Shock lineup. The watch featured premium finishes throughout its construction without compromising the basic shock resistance of a G-Shock. In 2019, Casio introduced the production version of the Dream Project which featured an upgraded module now incorporating Bluetooth time reception capabilities in addition to the radiowave time reception and began taking reservations at select G-Shock botiques in Japan. 35 units of the Dream Project square would be produced with each having a retail price of 7.7 million ¥ (69,500 US$ at 2019 exchange rates) excluding taxes making it the most expensive G-Shock watch to date.

In 2016, Casio released the GWN-Q1000 Gulfmaster which was first G-Shock to incorporate quad sensors (pressure sensor, temperature sensor, depth sensor and direction sensor). It was also the first G-Shock to feature horizontal calibration which allowed the compass to be operated while the watch is being worn by the user on the wrist. In addition to that, Casio offered every function offered on G-Shock models till date. The GWN-Q1000 is the only analog G-Shock to feature a depth sensor as well as the first G-Shock to have carbon reinforced polymer construction for the case. 

In September 2018, to mark the 35th anniversary of G-Shock, Casio released a collection of four clear model of G-Shock watches called "The Glacier Gold" collection.

In late 2018, Casio introduced the newest addition to the G-Shock Rangeman series of models. The GPR-B1000 is a GPS centred model, which can use the GPS receiver to maintain the exact time, down to the second. This model also has triple sensors (altimeter, barometer and compass) as well as a backtracking function which allows the user to return to the same point from where he started the journey by the use of a map, a function which was previously exclusive for Casio's ProTrek line of watches. The watch also features Bluetooth connectivity which allows it to connect to a smartphone via an app and allows it to upload log data in the phone, download map information from the phone and also synchronise itself with the phone in order to keep perfect time. The watch comes without a replaceable battery. The battery is either charged by solar cells present on the face of the watch (called Tough Solar by Casio) or via a wireless charger supplied with the watch, a first for a Casio watch. 

In 2019, Casio released the GA-2100 which took design inspiration from the original DW-5000C but now incorporated an analog-digital display. Due to the octagonal bezel shape bearing a strong resemblance to the Audemars Piguet Royal Oak, the watch was nick-named "CasiOak" by fans. The use of the carbon reinforced plastic in the watch case allowed the watch to have a thickness of 11.8 mm, making it the thinnest G-Shock available as well as the lightest analog digital model with a weight of 51 grams. The aforementioned characteristics allowed the model to achieve increased popularity among collectors. A solar powered model with Bluetooth time reception capabilities called the GA-B2100 was released in 2022.

Multi-Band 6 
The Multi-Band 6 is a radio control technology first introduced on the GW9200 Riseman in 2008 and is a successor to the Multi-Band 5 (which supported synchronisation with 5 atomic time transmitters around the world) and Wave Ceptor (which supported synchronisation with atomic time transmitters present in the United States and Japan only) technologies. G-Shock watches with Multi-Band 6 technology can synchronise with one of the six atomic time transmitters in the world in order to keep accurate time. The following is a list of the six atomic time transmitters:

Japan

Watches can tune in to two locations:

The 40 kHz signal from JJY at Mount Otakadoya, near Fukushima (Ohtakadoyayama).

The 60 kHz signal from the Haganeyama Transmitter at Mount Hagane (Haganeyama).

China

Watches tune to the 68.5 kHz signal from BPC at Shangqiu. This is the newest additional signal; older multi-band 5 watches will not be able to connect to this signal, and must be upgraded to a newer multi-band 6 watch in order to synchronise from there.

United States

Watches tune to the 60 kHz signal from WWVB at Fort Collins.

United Kingdom

Watches tune to the 60 kHz MSF at Anthorn.

Germany

Watches tune to the 77.5 kHz low frequency time signal radio station DCF77 at Mainflingen.

Guinness World Record title 
On December 12, 2017, the G-Shock earned the Guinness World Record for the heaviest vehicle to drive over a watch. The officials from Guinness World Record drove a 24.97-tonne truck over the Casio G-Shock DW5600E-1. The G-Shock is the first watch by any company being able to withstand the challenge.

List of models

Master of G 

The Master of G series is the speciality line of G-shocks which were used to introduce new features that would eventually make their way to the standard production models. The lineup consists of:
 Frogman
 Wademan
 Raysman
 Lungman
 Fisherman
 Riseman
 Gaussman
 Seaman
 Antman
 Gulfman
 Rangeman
 Mudmaster
 Gulfmaster
 Gravitymaster

G-Lide Surfing editions
These models were released in 1996, designed and specifically made for the surfing market. The countdown timers on these models were designed to count down for surfing competitions, some of the later models have a yacht timer, moon and tide graphs so a surfer can keep track of the progress while competing on the water. Many of these models came equipped with a pair of strap adapters and a single one-piece resin or nylon band. These styles of band are also known as "crossband" in the Japanese domestic market. Resin bands for these models had open gaps or slits through the band. Casio refers to them as drainage slits; the idea is that water will drain out with no problems while in action when surfing. Most of these series models had a translucent band. These models were branded as X-Treme for the Japanese domestic market.

X-Treme Snow Board/Skateboard Editions
These models are identical to the surfing editions, and also released in 1996. They were designed for snowboarding and skateboarding competitors and competitions. The only difference is that these models came with nylon velcro bands.

Original Models/Squares

DW-5000
WW-5100
DW-5200
WW-5300
DW-5500
DW-5600C
DW-5600E
DW-056
DW-D5600
GM-5600
GW-5000/5000U 
GW-5510
GW-5500J/5600J
GWM-5600
GWM-5610/5610U
GW-S5600/S5600U
GL-200
GLS-5600
GLX-5600
GWX-5600
GMW-B5000
GX-56
GWX-56
G-D5000-9JR
GW-B5600
G-5600
G-5600E

Vintage/Classic Models

DW-5400
DW-5700
DW-5800
DW-5900
DW-6000
DW-6100
DW-6200
DW-6300 (Frogman)
DW-6400
DW-6500
DW-6600
DW-6700
DW-6800
DW-6900
DW-8000
DW-8100
DW-8200
DW-8300
DW-8400 (Mudman)
DW-8500
DW-8600 (Fisherman)
DW-8700
DW-8800
DW-8900 (MRG-100)
DW-9000
DW-9050
DW-9051
DW-9052
DW-9052V
DW-9200
DW-9300 (Raysman)
DW-9400
DW-9500
DW-9600
DW-9700 (Gulfman)
DW-9800 (Wademan)
DW-9900
DW-9950 (Seaman)
DW-001
DW-002
DW-003

Standard Analog-Digital Models 

 GA-100
 GA-110
 GA-120
 GA-140
 GA-150
 GA-200
 GA-400
 GA-500
 GA-700
 GA-800
 GA-900
 GA-2000
 GA-2100
 GA-B2100
 GA-2200
 G-100

Metal-Twisted G-Shock (MTG) 

 MTG-100 (2000)
 MTG-110 (2000)
 MTG-500 (2000)
 MTG-120 (2001)
 MTG-510 (2002)
 MTG-520 (2002)
 MTG-700/800 (2002)
 MTG-900 (2003)
 MTG-920 (2004)
 MTG-910 (2005)
 MTG-1000 (2008)
 MTG-1500 (2009)
 MTG-1100 (2009)
 MTG-1200 (2011)
 MTG-M900 (2012)
 MTG-S1000 (2013)
 MTG-G1000 (2015)
 MTG-B1000 (2018)
 MTG-B2000 (2020)
 MTG-B3000 (2022)

MR-G Series 

 MRG-1
 MRG-100
 MRG-110
 MRG-120
 MRG-130
 MRG-131
 MRG-200
 MRG-210
 MRG-220
 MRG-1000
 MRG-1100
 MRG-1200
 MRG-3000
 MRG-7000
 MRG-7100
 MRG-7500
 MRG-7600
 MRG-7700
 MRG-8000
 MRG-8100
 MRG-G1000
 MRG-B1000
 MRG-G2000
 MRG-B2000
 MRG-B5000

Modules
Frequent updates have produced a proliferation of modules with slightly varying feature sets:

See also 
 Casio
 Master of G
 Casio F91W
 Frogman
 Casio Wave Ceptor

References

External links

 International G-Shock website
 Casio Protrek
 ShockBase - Biggest G-Shock Database (Unofficial)

Casio brands
Casio watches
Japanese inventions
Products introduced in 1983